The Eckert IV projection is an equal-area pseudocylindrical map projection. The length of the polar lines is half that of the equator, and lines of longitude are semiellipses, or portions of ellipses. It was first described by Max Eckert in 1906 as one of a series of three pairs of pseudocylindrical projections. Within each pair, meridians are the same whereas parallels differ. Odd-numbered projections have parallels spaced equally, whereas even-numbered projections have parallels spaced to preserve area. Eckert IV is paired with Eckert III.

Formulas

Forward formulae
Given a sphere of radius R, central meridian λ and a point with geographical latitude φ and longitude λ, plane coordinates x and y can be computed using the following formulas:

 
where 
 

θ can be solved for numerically using Newton's method.

Inverse formulae

See also
 List of map projections
Eckert II projection
Eckert VI projection
Max Eckert-Greifendorff

References

External links

Eckert IV projection at Mathworld

Map projections
Equal-area projections